The Valea Nouă Chișer is a small river in Arad County, Romania, a left tributary of the river Crișul Alb. It is the former lower course of the river Chișer, which now discharges into the Canalul Morilor. It flows into the Crișul Alb in Chișineu-Criș.

References

Rivers of Romania
Rivers of Arad County